Keiferia lobata is a moth in the family Gelechiidae. It was described by Povolný in 1990. It is found in Bolivia.

References

Keiferia
Moths described in 1990